Erik "Kick" Svensson (16 April 1903 – 1942) was a Swedish footballer who played his entire career at Malmö FF as a forward.

Svensson's son, Lennart Svensson (born 1932), made nearly 200 appearances for Malmö FF as a midfielder.

References

1903 births
1942 deaths
Association football forwards
Allsvenskan players
Malmö FF players
Swedish footballers